Imtiazi Sanad is the fifth-highest Pakistani military award for gallantry or distinguished service in combat. It can be conferred upon any member of the Pakistani Armed Forces or Civil Armed Forces who is mentioned in the dispatches of a senior commander for actions that do not warrant a gallantry award. It may be considered equivalent of the Mentioned in Despatches in the Commonwealth honours system and the Bronze Star in the United States honours system. The next highest award in the Pakistani honours systems is the Tamgha-i-Jurat.

See also
 Awards and decorations of the Pakistan military

Notes

External links
 Decorations and Medals of Pakistan

Military awards and decorations of Pakistan